The Broadcast Film Critics Association Award for Best Family Film is a retired award that was handed out from 1995 to 2007.

List of winners and nominees

1990s
 1995: Babe
 1996: Fly Away Home
 1997: Anastasia
 1998: A Bug's Life
 1999: October Sky

2000s
2000: My Dog Skip
 Dr. Seuss' How The Grinch Stole Christmas
 The Family Man
 Remember the Titans

2001: Harry Potter and the Sorcerer's Stone
 The Princess Diaries
 Spy Kids

2002: Harry Potter and the Chamber of Secrets
 The Rookie
 Tuck Everlasting

2003: Pirates of the Caribbean: The Curse of the Black Pearl
 Freaky Friday
 Holes
 Peter Pan
 Whale Rider

2004: Finding Neverland
 Harry Potter and the Prisoner of Azkaban
 Lemony Snicket's A Series of Unfortunate Events
 Miracle
 Spider-Man 2

2005: The Chronicles of Narnia: The Lion, the Witch and the Wardrobe
 Charlie and the Chocolate Factory
 Harry Potter and the Goblet of Fire

2006: Charlotte's Web
 Akeelah and the Bee
 Flicka
 Lassie
 Pirates of the Caribbean: Dead Man's Chest

2007: Enchanted
 August Rush
 The Golden Compass
 Hairspray
 Harry Potter and the Order of the Phoenix

External links
 Official BFCA website

F

de:Broadcast Film Critics Association
fr:Critics Choice Awards
it:Broadcast Film Critics Association
vi:BFCA
zh:廣播影評人協會